Phir Milenge is a 2004 Indian drama film starring Shilpa Shetty, Salman Khan and Abhishek Bachchan. The film is directed by Revathi. The film dealt with the subject of AIDS and was inspired by the Hollywood film Philadelphia (1993). The film was critically acclaimed upon release but proved to be unsuccessful at the box-office.

Phir Milenge is noted as Shetty's career-best performance which earned her high critical acclaim and nominations for Best Actress at the Filmfare Awards, IIFA Awards, Star Screen Awards and Zee Cine Awards.

Plot 
Tamanna Sahni (Shilpa Shetty) is the creative head of a top advertising agency called T.J. Associates. Her dedication, ideas, designs, and hard work have mainly contributed to the success of the agency. She leaves for a college reunion and meets her college sweetheart Rohit Manchanda (Salman Khan). They rekindle their love for each other and share some intimate moments together. Eventually, Rohit leaves and Tamanna settles back into her usual routine.

When her sister, Tanya (Kamalinee Mukherjee), meets with an accident she decides to donate her blood.  However, her doctor, Dr. Raisingh (Revathi), informs her of testing positive for HIV. Tamanna's world turns upside down and she desperately tries to get into contact with Rohit but in vain, as he has been hospitalised due to HIV himself.

The news of Tamanna having HIV is soon spread around the office and she loses her job. Angered by her unfair dismissal she searches for a lawyer to fight her case. Unfortunately, there is no law in India concerned with such cases and all lawyers refuse to accept her case. Eventually, Tarun Anand (Abhishek Bachchan) agrees to represent her although he had initially rejected her. Tarun seeks assistance from Lal Sir who is his mentor and has experience in handling an HIV-related case. Unfortunately, Tarun and Tamanna lose the case and they refile the case in the high court (High Court of India).

Meanwhile, Tamanna reaches out to Rohit who is battling for his life in a hospital and dies in front of her due to AIDS.

Tarun fights the case very strongly and finally wins the case in high court. Tamanna later starts her own business venture and after 2 years is recognised by the Business Today as one of India's young achievers. Tamanna dedicates her award to Rohit.

Cast 
Shilpa Shetty as Tamanna Sahni
Salman Khan as Rohit Manchanda
Abhishek Bachchan as Advocate Tarun Anand
Mita Vashisht as Advocate Kalyani
Kamalinee Mukherjee as Tanya Sahni
Revathi as Dr. Raisingh
Nassar as Lal Sir
Raja Krishnamoorthy as TJ, Tamanna's boss
J. V. Somayajulu as Guruji

Soundtrack

The music is composed by Shankar–Ehsaan–Loy, Nikhil-Vinay & Bhavatharini and lyrics are penned by Prasoon Joshi & Sameer.

Critical reception 
Despite not being a commercial success, the performances of the film were applauded. Shilpa Shetty in particular was highly applauded for her portrayal of an HIV+ patient. Her performance earned her Best Actress nominations at the Filmfare Awards, IIFA Awards, Star Screen Awards and Zee Cine Awards.

Jagdish Chinappa, consultant paediatrician in his review; praised the film for tackling the sensitive theme of HIV and praised the performances.  "Excellent performances by Shetty, Bachchan and Khan make this film emotionally charged." He concludes his review stating "the making of this movie is a brave attempt to highlight some issues facing people with HIV. To film such a story without an eye on the box office is a tribute to the social commitment of the makers of this film." In another positive review Sanjay A Pai a consultant pathologist praised the film stating "This film shows that there is hope for Indian cinema. Whether this will translate into hope for India and the world in its struggle with AIDS remains to be seen." He also heaped praise on Shetty's performance "Shetty is marvellous in her role. She emotes well, whether as the hard working, committed advertising executive or as a grieving woman on learning her HIV status or as someone determined to fight the system. Above all, she has shown bravery in playing an unglamorous role—that of an HIV+ woman—again uncommon in Indian films. It would not surprise me if she wins accolades and awards." Film critic Shilpa Bharatan Iyer writing for Rediff Movies also praised Shetty's performance as the lead protagonist stating "Shetty comes up with a rare, subdued performance. Her life and work have been snatched from her, but yet, she refuses to bow to circumstances."  although she was less than impressed with Bachchan's performance as a lawyer stating "Bachchan pales in comparison to Denzel Washington, who played the lawyer in the Hollywood original. He lacks in oratorical skills, especially in the climax".  Of the film she states "Revathi spins a sensitive tale in her second film, after Mitr, My Friend (2002). The film has been adapted well to the Indian palate, and AIDS is woven delicately into the story. It educates without being preachy, something it may have been in the danger of. It tends to drag in the first half but more than touches your heartstrings later." She concludes her review stating "Phir Milenge is worth a watch for its sensitive handling of the  delicate subject of AIDS." in another positive review, critic Chitra Mahesh writing for The Hindu states "In Phir Milenge, a serious issue has been handled with sensitivity and realism. Every now and then comes a film that restores faith in cinema. And at the risk of sounding clichéd and repetitive reinforces the fact that the medium is a great platform to convey great stories, ideas and messages of hope." She was also impressed with the performance of Shetty stating "Shetty plays her role magnificently." and she praised the direction of Revathi stating "And then of course there is Revathi herself, who has crafted this entire venture with great sensitivity and empathy. Truly, a film that must be seen." Film critic Taran Adarsh was more critical of the film says "Director Revathi deserves a pat for attempting an issue-based film [Mahesh Manjrekar's Nidaan (2000) was also based on this issue]. But it's evident that she hasn't done complete research and updated herself on the issue. Even otherwise, her storytelling is of the kind that might only appeal to a niche audience" however, he hailed Shetty's performance: "Phir Milenge belongs to Shetty completely. She delivers, what can be rightly called, the performance of her career. The viewer feels and empathizes with the character mainly because of her effective portrayal. She conveys the pain and the emotional upheaval through her expressive eyes, making it amongst the most memorable performances the year has seen so far." Namrata Joshi was also critical of the film; says "Revathi keeps her narrative low-key - be it the emotions, the dialogues, the songs or the sprinkling of warm close-ups. But often she becomes so still and stiff in her quietude that the audience cannot hear the crucial whispers." She applauded Shetty's performance stating "Shilpa gets an 'artistic' role to dig her teeth into and she gives it all the poignancy and feeling she's got. It's the fringe characters that don't get fleshed out, particularly that of Mita Vashisht, the rival lawyer who is nothing more than a caricature". Stephen Horne praised the film and Shetty's performance stating "After years of hard work, her resume still lacked that one special film that properly allowed her to flex her acting muscles. In 2004, her big chance finally arrived when she was cast in the lead role (and received top billing to boot, a rarity for female performers in Bollywood) in the HIV awareness drama Phir Milenge ("We'll Meet Again"). And while this film's controversial subject matter ensured its dismal failure at the Indian box office, its poignant story, sensitive portrayals and heartfelt performances garnered it much praise from fans and critics alike, who all had nothing but encouraging words to offer for Shetty's work in particular. An actress was born! Bachchan hadn't yet quite hit the big time during the making of this film, but his turn as the struggling advocate Tarun gives a nice indication of the good things to come. Though he falters slightly in his numerous grandiose speeches in court, Bachchan still brings forth his usual gusto and boyish charm to deliver a memorable performance. But the backbone of Phir Milenge is undoubtedly Shetty herself who carries every single frame she appears in; her ability to portray Tamanna's pain and anguish with startling believability. Her journey from carefree, fun-loving bigshot to frightened, heartbroken outcast is played to absolute perfection". Film critic S Das also praised the film and applauded Shetty's performance "Phir Milenge clearly marks a turning point in her heretofore lackluster filmograhy. Phir Milenge presents a Shilpa Shetty redefined. Her superlative performance in this film gives audiences a window into Tamanna's heart and soul. There is no trace of an item-girl beginning to take on serious roles; as a woman fighting for dignity in a society that fears and condemns her, Shetty definitively demonstrates that she is an exceptional actress capable of outstanding work. She plays her character with a kind of quiet grace, nobility, and sincerity that many of her contemporaries could not dream of conjuring. Take, for instance, the scene in which Tamanna meets her lawyer, Tarun (Bachchan), and he declines to shake her hand. The beautiful Ms. Shetty expresses volumes of pain with just her shifting eyes and disturbed body language. In that moment, Tamanna's essence is shaken, and Shetty makes it known without externalizing too much; we get an even more acute sense of her pain because we see how she fights to conceal it. Shetty creates many such understated levels of meaning in Tamanna's mannerisms; and, in doing so, makes her character all the more sympathetic and genuine. Shetty's attention to detail is spellbinding, and the level of artistry and ingenuity she demonstrates throughout the film never falls short of brilliant. Such sensitive moments abound in Revathi's well-written, thought-provoking script And, propped up by fantastic performances and an uplifting script, the director realizes her goal with awesome success. The heart of this success, undoubtedly, is Shetty. Her endlessly-intriguing performance carries the film; she embodies its pathos, its resonance, its message. After a performance of this caliber, neither critics nor audiences can afford not to take Ms. Shetty seriously - as doing so would be to waste one of the finest acting talents in the industry today."

Bachchan received the Zee Cine Award for Best Actor in a Supporting Role – Male for his performance in the film.

References

External links
 

2004 films
2000s Hindi-language films
HIV/AIDS in Indian films
Indian remakes of American films
Indian courtroom films
2004 drama films
Films scored by Nikhil-Vinay
Films scored by Shankar–Ehsaan–Loy
Films scored by Bhavatharini
Films directed by Revathi